Sidney Mills (born 1959) is a British Jamaican musician, performing mostly within the reggae genre and best known as a member of the roots reggae band Steel Pulse. Mills was born in the United Kingdom and moved to Jamaica as a child. He was raised in the Saint Thomas Parish, Jamaica and became a musician from an early age, moving to Kingston in the late 1960s to pursue a musical career. Sidney attended Kings College Kingston where he matured as a musician under the tutelage of the likes of Sonny Bradshaw.

In 1981, he moved to New York City, performing alongside reggae and Jamaican musical artists such as Shabba Ranks and lovers rock icon Judy Mowatt. Sidney has been the keyboard player for the Grammy award-winning band Steel Pulse since 1988. He has collaborated with a wide array of artists, including Boogie Down Productions, Aswad and Smashing Pumpkins. He is the founder of New York-based record company Living Room Records, which notably released albums featuring Dennis Brown and Sylvia Tella.

Collaborations 
Mills and Steel Pulse's David Hinds collaborated to produce Franklin’s Tower for the album Fire On The Mountain: Reggae Celebrates The Grateful Dead. Sidney also scored the soundtrack for the film . He has collaborated on albums released by Frankie Paul, Ziggy Marley, Mikey Dread Shinehead, Shabba Ranks, The Neville Brothers, Gwen Guthrie, Lionize, Toots Hibbert and Sly & Robbie.

Mills also collaborated with spoken word artist and producer Malik Al Nasir on  Malik & the O.G's album Rhythms of the Diaspora Vol. 1.  Sidney played keyboard vibes on the track entitled "Immigrants - Free at last".

He was the producer of the historic album by Larry McDonald featuring Mutabaruka, Toots Hibbert, Sly Dunbar, Bob Andy, Stranger Cole, Uziah Thompson, Dollarman, Bongo Herman for executive producer Malik Al Nasir for MCPR Music.

As a producer
Mills produced the single "Here's to Love" by reggae artist Cha’Maine and the accompanying album. He has also produced the album Drumquestra for the Jamaican percussionist Larry McDonald.

Filmography 
Larry McDonald, featuring Dollarman "Head over Heels" - Music Video; Executive Producer: Malik Al Nasir; Co Producer: Omar Hendricks; Producer: Andy Chapman; Director: Mehhaj Huda; shot on location in Jamaica for MCPR Music.

References

External links

Jamaican record producers
Jamaican reggae musicians
Living people
People from Saint Thomas Parish, Jamaica
British emigrants to Jamaica
Black British musicians
1959 births